Riethmuller (and Riethmüller) is a surname. Notable people with the surname include:

Albrecht Riethmüller (born 1947), German musicologist
Frank Riethmuller (1884–1965), Australian rose breeder
Joel Riethmuller (born 1985), Italian rugby league player
Otto Riethmüller (1889–1938), German Lutheran minister, writer and hymnwriter